Sedgwick Reserve is a  nature reserve in Santa Barbara County, California, United States. It is located in the San Rafael Mountains, 35 miles north of Santa Barbara near the town of Santa Ynez. The reserve is used for natural science research and education as it includes a wide range of native ecosystems, such as vernal pools, chaparral, and coastal sage scrub.

Administered by the University of California, Santa Barbara, it is a unit of the University of California Natural Reserve System.

The reserve was included in the Prescribed Fire Training Exchange (TREX)  held November 12-19, 2022 with a controlled fire by firefighters to clear away dead undergrowth and other debris. The training on how to safely conduct prescribed burns, seminars on local fire ecology, and tribal burning included Santa Barbara County Fire Department, employees of the Santa Ynez Band of Chumash Indians, The Nature Conservancy, University of California Agriculture and Natural Resources, Vandenberg Space Force Base, scientists, ranchers, students, researchers, and land managers.

See also
California montane chaparral and woodlands
Flora of the Transverse Ranges

References

External links
Sedgwick Reserve website

University of California Natural Reserve System
Protected areas of Santa Barbara County, California
San Rafael Mountains
University of California, Santa Barbara
California chaparral and woodlands
•